Casimir the Great High School in Zduńska Wola is a public secondary school founded in 1905, and located at 6 Dąbrowskiego Street in Zduńska Wola, Poland.

References

Educational institutions established in 1905
Schools in Poland
1905 establishments in the Russian Empire